Bernardus ("Ber") Groosjohan (16 June 1897 in Rotterdam – 5 August 1971 in Rotterdam) was a football (soccer) player from the Netherlands, who represented his native country at the 1920 Summer Olympics in Antwerp and the  1924 Summer Olympics in Paris. In Antwerp Groosjohan won the bronze medal with the Netherlands national football team.

References

1897 births
1971 deaths
Dutch footballers
Footballers at the 1920 Summer Olympics
Footballers at the 1924 Summer Olympics
Olympic footballers of the Netherlands
Olympic bronze medalists for the Netherlands
Footballers from Rotterdam
Netherlands international footballers
Olympic medalists in football
Medalists at the 1920 Summer Olympics
Association football forwards
Sparta Rotterdam players